Jorge Perugorría Rodríguez (aka "Pichi," born 13 August 1965) is a Cuban actor, film director and painter. He is well known for his part as Diego in Strawberry and Chocolate (original title in Spanish Fresa y chocolate (co-directed by Tomás Gutiérrez Alea and Juan Carlos Tabío). He recently acted in Steven Soderbergh's Che, with Benicio del Toro and in the original Netflix series Four Seasons in Havana. He lives in Santa Fe, a neighborhood on the outskirts of Havana, with his wife Elsa Maria Fuentes de La Paz and their four children.

Career
Perrugorría studied civil engineering until he turned to theater. He played Shakespeare with the Olga Alonso troupe, and starred in The Glass Menagerie with the Ritan Mountainer troupe. In the early 1990s, Perugorría helped found Havana’s Public Theatre, which started with Jean Genet’s The Maids. In this play, Perugorría acted the difficult part of Clara, working on a real gestural dimension for this feminine character. This led to his first opportunity in cinema.

Perugorría has played in several TV series or short films, but his first cinema success was Fresa y Chocolate (Strawberry and Chocolate), in which he played the part of Diego, a gay young man who meets a straight university student named David. The movie, subtly dealing with tolerance and sexual politics, made Perugorría recognizable as one of Cuba’s most famous actors. 

From that moment, he has acted in nearly 50 films, including Boceto directed by Tomás Piard and Derecho de asilo by Octavio Cortázar. He has also appeared in Steven Soderbergh’s Che, and directed and acted in Se vende (For sale), a black comedy about the selling of bones of dead people. He is portraying Cuban police detective Conde in Four Seasons in Havana, a Netflix series based on novels of Cuban writer Leonardo Padura. It is a Spanish production by Tornesol.

Awards/Nominations
 In 2015 he was nominated for the “Platino Award” for his role as Conde, from the Platino Awards for Iberoamerican Cinema. 

 In 2014 he won the “Special Precolumbian Icon” from the Bogota Film Festival.

 In 2014 he was nominated for the “Audience Award” from Havana Film Festival.

 In 2012 he was nominated for “Audience Award” from SXSW Film Festival in Austin, Texas.

 In 2009 he won the“Special Jury Award” for the film El cuerno de la abundancia from Mar del Plata Film Festival.

 In 2009 he won “Honorary award” from Lleida Latin-American Film Festival.

 In 2006 he won a special award for his career accomplishments from the Turia Awards.

 In 2003 he won “Special Mention” for the film Habana Abierta in the Havana Film Festival.

 In 2003 he won “El Megano Award” for the film Habana Abierta in the Havana Film Festival.

 In 2001 he won “Golden India Catalina” for the film Waiting list from the Cartagena Film Festival.

 In the year 2000 he won “Special Award” for the film Volaverunt from the Yoga Awards.

 In 1995 he won “Premio Ace” for the film Strawberry and Chocolates.

 In 1994 he won “Silver Hugo” for the film Strawberry and Chocolates from the Chicago International Film Festival.

 In 1994 he won “Golden kikito” for the film Strawberry and Chocolates from the Gramado Film Festival.

 In 1993 he won “Best Actor” for the film Strawberry and Chocolates from Havana Film Festival.

Filmography

Director/Producer
 2015: Fátima o el Parque de la Fraternidad 

 2012: Se Vende 

 2012: Amor crónico 

 2010: Afinidades

 2005: Santiago y la Virgen en la Fiesta del Fuego (Documentary short) 

 2003: Habana abierta

Actor
 2018: Havana Kyrie 

 2018: Black is Beltza 

 2018: Rubirosa 

 2017: Kimura 

 2016: Un Cuento de Circo & A Love Song 

 2016: Vientos de la Habana (Four Seasons in Havana) (TV Mini-Series) 

 2015: Viva 

 2015: Isola Margherita (TV Mini-Series) 

 2014: Tarde para Ramón (Short) 

 2014: Return to Ithaca 

 2014: La pared de las palabras 

 2014: La muerte del gato (Short) 

 2014: His Wedding Dress 

 2014: Boccaccerías Habaneras 

 2012: Un amor de película 

 2012: Se Vende 

 2012: Edificio Royal 

 2012: Dragoi ehiztaria 

 2012: Clara no es nombre de mujer 

 2012: Amor crónico 

 2012: 7 Days in Havana 

 2012-2013: Lynch (TV Series) 

 2010: Boleto al paraíso 

 2010: Afinidades 

 2008: La mala 

 2008: Che: Part One 

 2008: Che: Part Two 

 2008: Horn of Plenty 

 2007: The Heart of the Earth 

 2007: Night of the Innocents 

 2006: Virgin Rose

 2005: Queens 

 2005: Hormigas en la boca 

 2005: Gaijin - Ama-me Como Sou 

 2005: Frutas en el café 

 2005: Barrio Cuba 

 2004: Scent of Oak 

 2004: Caribe 

 2004: @Festivbercine.ron 

 2003: Tánger 

 2003: Más vampiros en La Habana 

 2002: Rancour 

 2002: Nowhere 

 2001: Vajont - La diga del disonore 

 2001: Honey for Oshun 

 2000: Turbulence 

 2000: Tierra del fuego 

 2000: The Waiting List 

 1999: Volavérunt 

 1999: By My Side Again 

 1998: Sidoglio Smithee 

 1998: Doña Bárbara 

 1997: Things I Left in Havana

 1997: Razor in the Flesh 

 1997: Life According to Muriel 

 1997: Clandestine Stories in Havana 

 1997: Amor vertical 

 1996: Un asunto privado 

 1996: Oedipo alcalde 

 1996: Cachito 

 1996: Bámbola 

 1996: La sal de la vida 

 1995: Shiralad. El regreso de los dioses (TV Series) 

 1995: Guantanamera 

 1995: Dile a Laura que la quiero 

 1994: Maite 

 1993: Strawberry and Chocolate 

 1993: Los perros tienen hambre (Short) 

 1993: Derecho de asilo 

 1966: Rio, Verão & Amor

References
 
- Gaijin2 - Ama-me como sou!( pictures)
- Gaijin2 - Ama-me como sou!( trailer)

http://link.galegroup.com.ezproxy.library.berkeley.org/apps/doc/A18125291/BIC?u=berkeleycoll&sid=BIC&xid=42d92946

Trivia 
Since 2005, Jorge Perugorría has been one of the patrons of DreamAgo, an international screenwriters association.

External links
 Official website

 
 
 
 
 
 

1965 births
Living people
Male actors from Havana
Cuban people of Basque descent
Citizens of Spain through descent
Cuban male film actors
20th-century Cuban male actors
21st-century Cuban male actors
Cuban film directors
Cuban male stage actors
Cuban male television actors